Spring Street is an American LGBT web series created by David Beck.  The series was a production of The Great Griffon, Beck's non-profit LGBT film company dedicated to "telling tales of the underdog".  In addition to Beck, the series stars Alanna Blair, Giordan Diaz, Luis Villalobos, Michael Earle-Fajardo, Rosina Fernhoff, and Jennifer Bobbi.  Dealing with the themes of loss, betrayal, addiction, and the healing power of music, the series focuses on Mr. Christopher, a reclusive piano teacher (played by Beck), his pregnant sister recovering from a heroin addiction (Blair), and a mysterious new student who may or may not have ties to their grandmother's death (Diaz).  The first season was released on YouTube in nine episodes between March and May 2017.  On March 15, 2017, Zach Stafford of OUT Magazine featured an exclusive sneak peek of Spring Street before its premiere.  A second season is yet to be announced.

Production 
The successful Kickstarter campaign was endorsed by The HuffPost, who quoted Beck:  "This is not an LGBTQ story; this is a human story."  Internationally recognized drag queen Manila Luzon also championed the web series.  Production for the eighty-eight minute web series took place over nine days throughout New York, including one overnight on the subway.  Fashion designer Viktor Luna was hired as a key set dresser in addition to designing the red gown for Rosina Fernhoff in the pivotal episode six on the New York subway.  Greek queer filmmaker Natalia Bougadellis co-directed alongside Beck, in addition to creating the cinematography and acting as producer.  Iorgo Papoutsas and editor Susan Hunt were also on board as producers.

Cast 
 David Beck as Christopher O'Brien
 Giordan Diaz as Ricardo
 Alanna Blair as Anna O'Brien
 Michael Earle Fajardo as Manny
 Luis Villalobos as Sergio
 Nairoby Otero as Elena
 Rosina Fernhoff as Maggie "Grammy" O'Brien
 Jennifer Bobbi as Betty
 Rosemarie Mitchell as Lena
 Sarah Jun as Cindy
 Kenny Chin as Pete
 Toni Murray as Lucy
 Dolly Mariah as Yara
 Mariana Parma as Marta
 Phoenix Williams as Clayton Davies
 Kate Hodge as Mrs. Davies
 Gloria Makino as Opera Singer
 Elliot Fishman as Young Christopher
 Gary Roth as Old Man in Dream
 Colin Buckingham as Violinist on Street
 Aaron Kelly as Gay Piano Bar Patron / Streetwalker in Drag
 Thomas M. Harland as Gay Piano Bar Patron / Opera Patron
 Iorgo Papoutsas as AA Chairperson
 Robert Arteca as AA Meeting Attendee / Gay Piano Bar Patron
 Anand Dharawat as AA Meeting Attendee
 Claudia Fanaro as AA Meeting Attendee
 Jose Carlos Goma as AA Meeting Attendee
 Candice Opperman as AA Meeting Attendee
 Sam Smith as AA Meeting Attendee
 Anthony Wills Jr. as Jammal / Cabaret Pianist
 Aaron Kelly as Streetwalker in Drag / Gay Piano Bar Patron
 Aunt Barbara (Jennifer Bobbi) as Drag Queen
 Jorge Gigi Cutina Flores as Drag Queen
 Hector Simone Xtravaganza as Drag Queen
 Roberto Mejia as Topless Waiter
 Robert Benge as Gay Piano Bar Patron
 McCailey Contreras as Gay Piano Bar Patron
 Tad Greene as Gay Piano Bar Patron
 Elijah Krenik as Gay Piano Bar Patron
 Jim Quinlivan as Gay Piano Bar Patron
 Daniel Silvestre as Gay Piano Bar Patron
 Mary-Anne Brady Bennett as Opera Patron
 Marko Caka as Opera Patron
 Mason Gooding as Opera House Bartender
 Viktor Luna as Opera Patron (cameo)
 Louis Herrera as Opera Patron
 Barry Liebman as Opera Patron
 Robin Westle as Opera Patron
 Daddy Tom as Guy in Bar
 Daisy Park as Eila /
 Iris and Auden Park as Family in the Park

Music 
The music, mainly composed and performed by Beck, who is a professional pianist, is inspired by classical music, including Chopin, Mozart, and Dvorak.  Luis Villalobos, acclaimed violinist of the Villalobos Brothers, also contributed to the score.  Singer-songwriter Meg Cavanaugh covered the jazz standard "How About You" for the teaser.  Cavanaugh also contributed her original songs "Pinafore" and "Waltz" to the soundtrack, which also includes "Sons and Daughters" by Radiant Reveries.

Awards and nominations 
Spring Street was nominated as Best Indie Web Series at the 7th Streamy Awards.  It was also nominated as Best Web Series by the International Online Web Fest.  In addition, Beck was honored with a nomination by IOWB for Best Screenplay.  Spring Street was selected as Project of the Day by Indiewire, and subsequently was voted as Indiewire's Project of the Week.  In reviewing Season One, Sam Gutelle of Tubefilter writes: "Spring Street is here, and it is an eye-catching, complex show driven by its patient cinematography and round characters...Spring Street is a steadily paced, thoughtful show, and diving into it requires careful attention, but it rewards faithful viewers with a well-composed, artful experience. In other words, the show is a lot like the classical music it uses as its soundtrack: Give it time to piece itself together, and it will impress you."

References

American LGBT-related web series
Streamy Awards